The 9th Marine Aircraft Wing was an aviation unit of the United States Marine Corps based at Marine Corps Air Station Cherry Point, North Carolina.  The wing was commissioned during World War II as a training unit for Marine Aviation personnel headed to the Pacific Theater.

Mission
Train, equip and prepare Marine aviation units for combat

Subordinate units
 Marine Aircraft Groups MAG-33, MAG-34, MAG-35, MAG-51, MAG-52, MAG-53, MAG-62, MAG-91, MAG-92, MAG-93, MAG-94
 Marine Corps Aviation Bases: Atlantic, Bogue, Congaree, Eagle Mountain Lake, Greeneville, Kinston, Newport, New River, Oak Grove, Parris Island, Walnut Ridge.

History
The 9th Marine Aircraft Wing (9th MAW) was commissioned on April 1, 1944 at Marine Corps Air Station Cherry Point, North Carolina.  9th MAW replaced the 3rd Marine Aircraft Wing in the role of training, equipping, and preparing East Coast Marine Corps Aviation units for combat.  It was also responsible for administering all of the airfields in the Cherry Point area.  In late 1944, 9th MAW was almost disbanded in favor of a Marine Air Training Command, East Coast but that idea was never acted upon.  The wing was decommissioned on March 31, 1946 in accordance with MarCorps Confidential Dispatch 052213 of March 1946.  This coincided with the 2nd Marine Aircraft Wing returning to the States and assuming control of Marine aviation units on the East Coast.

Commanding officers
 Colonel Christian F. Schilt – April 1 – June 16, 1944
 Brigadier General Lewie G. Merritt – September 21, 1944 – January 16, 1945
 Brigadier General Christian F. Schilt – January 17 – February 15, 1945
 Colonel Lawrence T. Burke – February 16 – April 22, 1945
 Brigadier General Harold D. Campbell – April 23, 1945 – March 31, 1946

See also

 List of United States Marine Corps aircraft wings
 List of United States Marine Corps aircraft squadrons

Citations

References

Bibliography

Bibliography
 9th MAW Unit History

1e
009
Military units and formations of the United States Marine Corps in World War II